Euphlyctinides indi is a species of moth of the family Limacodidae. It is found in north-eastern India at an altitude of 1,800 meters.

The wingspan is about 22 mm. The head, thorax and abdomen are brownish. The forewings are bronze brown with sparse dark scales. The hindwings are dark, greyish brown. Adults have been recorded in mid-July.

Etymology
The species name indi is derived from India and refers to the country of the type locality.

References

Limacodidae
Moths described in 2009
Moths of Asia